António Nunes Ribeiro Sanches (7 March 1699, – 14 October 1783) was an 18th-century Portuguese physician, philosopher and encyclopédiste. He was a cristão novo of Jewish descent, probably a practising Jew.

He studied at the universities of Coimbra and Salamanca. He fled Portugal after being targeted by the Inquisition. Sanches moved to London. He then went to Leyden University where he completed his formation under the direction of Herman Boerhaave. He subsequently worked as a physician in various European countries. He was among the three physicians that empress Anna of Russia asked the latter to recommend to her in 1731.

Appointed doctor of the Russian army, he distinguished himself before becoming a court physician. After more than 15 years of stay in Russia, he left the country in 1748 after empress Elizabeth Petrowna had denounced two of his doctor colleagues as Jews. Having had the chance, amid the daily proscriptions which he witnessed to be allowed to leave the country, he took the way to Paris in 1748 where he ended his life. After she ascended to the throne, Catherine the Great rewarded him for his services with a pension of 1000 rubles, which was punctually paid until his death.
His extensive library was by the empress.

He gave the article "" ("smallpox") to the Encyclopédie by Diderot and D'Alembert.
He was the first to acquaint western physicians with the effects of Russian steam baths.

was considered an "Estrangeirado", a Portuguese that has been influenced greatly by foreign ideas. He was a critic of the nobility, clerical privileges and slavery.

Works 
 1726: Discurso Sobre as Águas de Penha Garcia.
 1751: A Dissertation on the Venereal Disease.
 1752: Dissertation sur le origine de la maladie vénérienne, Paris
 1756: Tratado da Conservação da Saúde dos Povos.
 1760: Cartas sobre a Educação da Mocidade.
 1763: Método para Aprender e Estudar a Medicina.
 1771: Les bains des vapeurs russe
 1774: Examen historique sur l´apparition de la maladie vénérienne (Paris)
 1779: Mémoire sur les Bains de Vapeur en Russie..

Bibliography 
 Georges Dulac, Science et politique : les réseaux du Dr António Ribeiro Sanches, Cahiers du Monde russe (ISSN 1252-6576), 2002, 43/2-3, (p. 251–274) (Read online).
 Hugh James Rose, A New General Biographical Dictionary, t. 11, Londres, B. Fellowes, 1857, (p. 443).
 José Luis Doria: Antonio Ribeiro Sanches. A Portuguese doctor in 18th century Europe. (PDF; 320 kB) Antonio Ribeiro Sanches, Vesalius, VII, 1, 27 - 35, 2001. 
 Erwin Ackerknecht: Boerhaave Schüler als Medizinalpolitiker, in Erna Lesky, Adam Wandruszka (Hrsg.) Gerard van Swieten und seine Zeit, Böhlau 1973, (p. 122).

External links 
 New Christians and Old Christians in Portugal, written by Ribeiro Sanches in 1748 
 Instituto Camões
 João Nabais: Ribeiro Sanches - Tal como Amato um Mèdico do Mundo pdf, 60-73

1699 births
1783 deaths
Portuguese Jews
People from Penamacor
18th-century Portuguese physicians
Portuguese medical writers
University of Salamanca alumni
Contributors to the Encyclopédie (1751–1772)
Members of the French Academy of Sciences
Honorary members of the Saint Petersburg Academy of Sciences
Immigrants to the Russian Empire
Jewish scientists from the Russian Empire